Silvia Marty (born July 10, 1980; Barcelona, Catalonia, Spain) is a Spanish actress, dancer, and singer.

Silvia became famous for playing Ingrid Muñoz in the Spanish TV series Un paso adelante, along with actors like Mónica Cruz, Beatriz Luengo, Pablo Puyol, Dafne Fernández, and Lola Herrera.

She is a member of the Upa dance musical group, which consist of young actors from the Spanish series Un paso adelante and also presented the "XIII premios unión de actores".

Filmography

References

External links 
 

1980 births
Living people
Spanish television actresses
Spanish female dancers
Actresses from Barcelona
Singers from Barcelona
21st-century Spanish singers
21st-century Spanish women singers
21st-century Spanish actresses